Super B is a 2002 Philippine comedy superhero film directed by Joyce Bernal. The film stars Rufa Mae Quinto as the title role. It was one of the entries in the 2002 Manila Film Festival and the first film produced by Neo Films since 1999.

The film is streaming online on YouTube.

Cast
 Rufa Mae Quinto as Bilma
 Marvin Agustin as Lordino
 Melanie Marquez as Rose
 Mylene Dizon as Daisy
 Troy Montero as Edgar
 Aiza Marquez as Emilyn
 Isabelle de Leon as Wennie
 Dick Israel as Tatay Billy
 Maria Isabel Lopez as Nanay Mameng
 Marissa Delgado as Madam Puring

References

External links

Full Movie on Viva Films

2002 films
2002 comedy films
Filipino-language films
Philippine action comedy films
Philippine fantasy comedy films
Philippine superhero films
Neo Films films
Films directed by Joyce Bernal